TI Connect is an application available from Texas Instruments (TI) that allows users to transfer files between a TI graphing calculator and a computer via a link cable. While all models that are capable of linking are supported with the macOS version of TI-Connect, the TI-82 and TI-85 are not currently supported with the Windows version. It has been superseded with TI Connect CE.

TI Connect is the successor of the TI-Graph Link software and contains similar functionality.  Even though TI Connect was released 6 years after Windows 95 came out, this was TI’s first attempt to move out of the 16-bit software paradigm made prevalent in Windows 3.1. One feature which TI Connect did not retain from TI-Graph Link was the ability to edit TI-BASIC on a computer, but unlike TI-Graph Link, does not require a software version specific to each calculator.

Many slowdowns are experienced with the software, usually resulting from the slow USB connection between the computer and calculator. Unexplained errors sometimes occur with the software, preventing users from transferring programs over. One solution is to use the TI SendTo sub-application, which is more stable than the Device Explorer.

References

External links
 http://education.ti.com/educationportal/sites/US/productDetail/us_ti_connect.html

Graphing calculator software
Texas Instruments calculators